The Gran Canaria giant tortoise (Centrochelys vulcanica) is an extinct species of cryptodire turtle in the family Testudinidae endemic to the island of Gran Canaria, in the Canary Islands.

Characteristics 
This is one of the two described species of giant tortoises that inhabited the Canary Islands from the Miocene to the upper Pleistocene. The other species is C. burchardi, from the island of Tenerife.

C. vulcanica was described by López-Jurado & Mateo in 1993. It is believed that the ancestors of these two species of giant tortoises reached the Canary Islands from North Africa. The majority of C. vulcanica fossils are of eggs and nests ranging in age from the Miocene until Pliocene.  Bones and shells are known from the Miocene to the Upper Pleistocene.   The maximum shell length is up to 61 centimeters, make it slightly smaller than C. burchardi, which had a shell length range of 65 to 94 cm.

Fossilized tortoise eggs have been found in the islands of Lanzarote and Fuerteventura; however, these eggs have not yet been properly described or named. The Fuerteventura fossils have been linked to C. burchardi, but this identification is uncertain, and has been challenged.

See also 
 List of extinct animals
 List of African animals extinct in the Holocene
 List of extinct animals of Europe
 Island gigantism

References 

Miocene turtles
Geochelone
Extinct reptiles
Reptiles of the Canary Islands
Pliocene turtles
Pleistocene turtles
Miocene species first appearances
Pleistocene species extinctions
Fossil taxa described in 1993